Pyotr Petrovich Konchalovsky (also trans. Petr; ; 21 February 1876 – 2 February 1956) was a Russian and Soviet painter, a member of the Knave of Diamonds group.

Biography

Early life 
Pyotr Konchalovsky was born in the village of Slavianka, Izyumsky Uyezd, Kharkov Governorate (present-day Ukraine) on 21 February 1876. His father was a translator and art publisher, with connections to many of the artists active in Russia during the late 19th century. In 1889, the Konchalovskys moved to Moscow and their house became a part of the Moscow art scene of the 1890s. Their house was often visited by Valentin Serov, Mikhail Vrubel, Vasily Surikov.

During his gymnasium years Konchalovsky attended classes of Moscow School of Painting, Sculpture and Architecture. In 1896-1898 he traveled to Paris and studied at the Académie Julian. In 1899, he returned to Russia and entered the Imperial Academy of Arts in Saint Petersburg, graduating in 1907. At the academy, he studied under Savinsky, Zaleman and Kovalevsky.

Career

Breakout days in the Moskow avant-guard 

His public debut was at the Salon des Indépendants exhibition in Paris, 1908, but Konchalovsky soon returned to Moscow, bringing with him new ideas (elements of his work from this period have been identified as "Fauvist"), as well as his more respectable Salon training.

By 1909, he was exhibiting frequently, participating in the Golden Fleece, Fraternity, Mir Iskusstva, and New Society of Artists. He was a founding member of the society Knave of Diamonds in 1909, a rebellious, avant-guard group seeking to synthesize the modern art breakthroughs of French and German styles with Russian primitivism. Where Western European looked to primitive African sculptures for artistic refreshment and inspiration, these Russian painters imagined they could turn to "indigenous" Russian works. Konchalovsky was elected as the group's chairman in 1911.

Post WWI advancements 
After serving in the Russian army 1914–1916, Konchalovsky returned to his art with moderated intentions. Beginning in 1918 he taught art. In 1922, he had his first solo exhibition at the Tretyakov Gallery.

During that period, he mostly drew still lifes and landscapes. His paintings—as of all other Jacks of Diamond—remained strongly influenced by Paul Cézanne. But he started to paint portraits (often Ceremonial Portraits) that are considered examples of socialist realism style.

Personal life 
Pyotr married a daughter of painter Vasily Surikov, who always praised the art of his son-in-law.

Work 
Konchalovsky was a very prolific painter, and is known to have created more than five thousand works over the course of his long creative life. His work demonstrates a "complex evolution" of styles.

The influence of Paul Cezanne was "clearly visible" in Konchalovsky's paintings in the pre-WWI period. Heralded as a member of Russia's avante guard, post war he became a Member of the U.S.S.R. Academy of Fine Arts and a People's Artist of the R.S.F.S.R. His paintings are considered to have made a significant contribution to "the development of Soviet realistic art."

Legacy 

Many of his descendants remained active in the world of art. His son Mikhail Petrovich Konchalovsky (b. 1906) was a notable painter. His daughter Natalia Konchalovskaya (1903–1988) was a notable children's writer and her husband Sergey Mikhalkov a notable poet, the author of children's poetry and two versions of the State Anthem of the Soviet Union and the present National anthem of Russia. They have two sons: Andrei Konchalovsky, a film writer, director and a painter (whose son Egor is also a notable film director) and Nikita Mikhalkov, also a movie director who, in 1994, won the Best Foreign Language Film Oscar for his film Burnt by the Sun.

In 2006, his heirs established the Petr Konchalovsky Foundation, a non-commercial beneficial organization created to consolidate Konchalovsky's legacy. In addition to organizing exhibitions and presentations of Konchalovsky's artworks, the foundation is dedicated to conservation and authentication of the artist's work.

Galleries

References

External links

Official Website of the Petr Konchalovsky Foundation
Biography and art of Konchalovsky
Art of Konchalovsky
Art of Konchalovsky

1876 births
1956 deaths

Painters from the Russian Empire
People from Sloviansk
People from Izyumsky Uyezd
Académie Julian alumni
Full Members of the USSR Academy of Arts
Imperial Academy of Arts alumni
Moscow School of Painting, Sculpture and Architecture alumni
Academic staff of Vkhutemas
People's Artists of the RSFSR (visual arts)
Stalin Prize winners
Recipients of the Order of the Red Banner of Labour
Mikhalkov family
Russian Futurist painters
Socialist realist artists
Russian people of Ukrainian descent
Soviet painters
Burials at Novodevichy Cemetery